The Turkish Writers' Union (abbreviated as TYS) is a trade union for writers in Turkey. It is sometimes confused with the Turkish Authors' Association as both may be translated as Writers Union of Turkey.  It was founded on 4 February 1974.

In 1982/3 the TYS President Aziz Nesin and all executive board members were charged with maintaining an illegal society, as all trade unions had been banned following the 1980 Turkish coup d'état.

It publishes a monthly journal TYS Edebiyat and a monthly bulletin TYS Aylik Bülten.

References

External links
 Official website

1974 establishments in Turkey
Trade unions in Turkey
Trade unions established in 1974
Writers' organizations by country